U-36 may refer to one of the following German submarines:

 , was a Type U 31 submarine launched in 1914 and that served in the First World War until sunk on 24 July 1915
 During the First World War, Germany also had these submarines with similar names:
 , a Type UB II submarine launched in 1915 and sunk on 9 May 1917
 , a Type UC II submarine launched in 1916 and sunk on 21 May 1917
 , a Type VIIA submarine that served in the Second World War until sunk on 4 December 1939
 , a Type 212 submarine of the Bundesmarine commissioned into service in late 2015.

Submarines of Germany